The Practical Statutes of the Session, later called Paterson's Practical Statutes, was published from 1850 onwards and included annotated copies of Acts of the Parliament of the United Kingdom passed between 1849 and 1943.

The Practical Statutes of the Session 1849 was published in 1853 and edited by Charles John Belcher Hertslet. The Practical Statutes of the Session 1850 was published in 1850 and edited by Edward William Cox and William Paterson. Other editors included James Sutherland Cotton, William de Bracy Herbert and A L Malcolm.

Volumes
Practical Statutes of the Session 1850
Practical Statutes of the Session 1856
Practical Statutes of the Session 1858
Practical Statutes of the Session 1861
Practical Statutes of the Session 1864
Practical Statutes of the Session 1885
Practical Statutes of the Session 1887
Practical Statutes of the Session 1888, Parts I and II
Practical Statutes of the Session 1889
Practical Statutes of the Session 1890
Practical Statutes of the Session 1891
Practical Statutes of the Session 1892
Practical Statutes of the Session 1893, Parts I and II
Practical Statutes of the Session 1894
Practical Statutes of the Session 1895
Practical Statutes of the Session 1896
Practical Statutes of the Session 1898
Practical Statutes of the Session 1908
Practical Statutes of the Session 1909
Practical Statutes of the Session 1910
Practical Statutes of the Session 1911
Practical Statutes of the Session 1912-1913
Practical Statutes of the Session 1923

External links

 Series on HathiTrust: volumes for 1849-1895 free to read, 1896-1922 search-only

References

Law books